Tasialuk (Inuktitut syllabics: ᑕᓯᐊᓗᒃ) formerly Ayr Lake is a land-locked freshwater lake, structurally a fjord, on Baffin Island's northeastern coast in the Qikiqtaaluk Region of Nunavut, Canada.

Geography
Tasialuk is located east of the Kangiqtualuk Uqquqti and Arviqtujuq Kangiqtua fjords. The Kuugaaluk flows out of the northern end of the lake and discharges its waters in the Baffin Bay a further  to the northeast.

In the inner area the Ayr Pass connects with the Arviqtujuq Kangiqtua to the west.

See also
List of lakes of Nunavut
List of lakes of Canada

References

External links
The mighty ramparts of Ayr Lake
Clyde River Proposed Territorial Park

Lakes of Qikiqtaaluk Region